Whangaparaoa College is a co-ed state secondary school located on the Hibiscus Coast. Preceding Whangaparaoa College was Hibiscus Coast Intermediate with the only other state secondary school on the Hibiscus Coast being Orewa College. The decile 9 school serves Years 7 to 13 with a role of  Learners (as at ) including Internationals. Opened officially in 2005, the founding principal was Brian O'Connell, who served until 2012. James Thomas took over the principal role in 2012, succeeding O'Connell. The current principal is Steve McCracken.

The school is in a high socio-economic area (high decile number), and has tight zoning rules where students must live to attend the school. This method prevents overcrowding.

Being a new school, the facilities and technology used are leaders in the New Zealand education system, positioned on an environmentally aware site. 2006 saw the rise of two new high decile schools in Metropolitan Auckland, Whangaparaoa College and Botany Downs Secondary School.

Contributing home zone schools
Note: Attendance at a contributing school 'in zone' does not give automatic entry into Stanmore Bay Secondary School (Whangaparaoa College)

 Stanmore Bay Primary School
 Whangaparaoa Primary School
 Gulf Harbour School
 Red Beach Primary School

Notes

Educational institutions established in 2005
Secondary schools in Auckland
Hibiscus and Bays Local Board Area
2005 establishments in New Zealand